Meep or MEEP may refer to:

Fiction
 Beep the Meep, a fictional alien who appeared in the Doctor Who weekly comic strip
 Meep (American Horror Story), a character in the television series American Horror Story
 Meeps, an alien life form depicted in the War Against the Chtorr series of novels by David Gerrold
 "Meep", the primary vocabulary of Beaker on The Muppet Show
 "Meep meep", an imitation of the sound produced by Looney Tunes character Road Runner
 Meep, a 2015 picture book by Andy Geppert

Science and technology
 Meep!, a computer tablet made by the company Oregon Scientific
 Mir Environmental Effects Payload

See also
 Beep, beep (disambiguation)